Usun-Kyuyol (Uhun Küöl) is a rural locality (a selo), the only inhabited locality, and the administrative center of Arylakhsky Rural Okrug of Verkhnekolymsky District in the Sakha Republic, Russia, located  from Zyryanka, the administrative center of the district. Its population as of the 2010 Census was 499, of whom 254 were male and 245 female, down from 575 recorded during the 2002 Census.

References

Notes

Sources
Official website of the Sakha Republic. Registry of the Administrative-Territorial Divisions of the Sakha Republic. Verkhnekolymsky District. 

Rural localities in Verkhnekolymsky District